Think Like a Girl is the second album by singer-songwriter Diana King. The album debuted and peaked at No. 1 on the Top Reggae Albums chart. It includes the hits "L-L-Lies", "Find My Way Back" and "I Say a Little Prayer".

Chart positions

Singles

Track listing

References

Diana King albums
1997 albums